Brady Township is a civil township of Saginaw County in the U.S. state of Michigan.  As of the 2010 Census, the township population was 2,218.

History
The first school in what is now Brady Township was established in 1855.  The Township itself was organized in 1856.

Communities

Geography

Demographics
As of the census of 2000, there were 2,344 people, 862 households, and 655 families residing in the township. There were 904 housing units at an average density of 24.6 per square mile (9.5/km2). The racial makeup of the township was 97.44% White, 0.55% African American, 0.17% Native American, 0.34% Asian, 0.04% Pacific Islander, 0.34% from other races, and 1.11% from two or more races. Hispanic or Latino of any race were 2.56% of the population.

There were 862 households, out of which 37.2% had children under the age of 18 living with them, 61.7% were married couples living together, 10.1% had a female householder with no husband present, and 23.9% were non-families. 19.5% of all households were made up of individuals, and 8.1% had someone living alone who was 65 years of age or older.  The average household size was 2.72 and the average family size was 3.11.

In the township the population was spread out, with 27.6% under the age of 18, 8.8% from 18 to 24, 29.2% from 25 to 44, 23.2% from 45 to 64, and 11.2% who were 65 years of age or older.  The median age was 36 years. For every 100 females, there were 99.2 males.  For every 100 females age 18 and over, there were 95.2 males.

The median income for a household in the township was $40,565, and the median income for a family was $42,196. Males had a median income of $32,500 versus $21,635 for females. The per capita income for the township was $16,723.  About 5.0% of families and 6.1% of the population were below the poverty line, including 6.9% of those under age 18 and 5.7% of those age 65 or over.

References

Townships in Saginaw County, Michigan
1856 establishments in Michigan
Populated places established in 1856
Townships in Michigan